The Lord family are fictional characters from the American soap opera One Life to Live. They were introduced in the show's July 15, 1968 debut episode on ABC, and featured for the entirety of its run until the series ended on August 19, 2013.

Created by Agnes Nixon, over 40 years of melodrama surrounding the lives and family of wealthy media mogul Victor Lord and his heiress daughter Victoria Lord establish the ensemble of characters as a central fixture throughout the serial. The family primarily resides in fictional Llanview, Pennsylvania, owning communications business Lord Enterprises and its flagship publication, The Banner newspaper.

Generations

Ancestors
 Randolph Lord (Larry Pine)  Lived in the late 1800s in the Old West as of 1988. Paternal grandfather of Victor Lord, Gwendolyn Lord, and Clayton-Powell Lord.

First generation
 Victor Lord (Ernest Graves, Shepperd Strudwick, William Stone Mahoney)  Original character. Born off-screen September 12, 1916, revised to June 18, 1926, dies onscreen June 16, 1976. Death revised onscreen to March 4, 2003.
 Gwendolyn Lord (Joan Copeland)  Born pre-1916. Sister of Victor Lord.
 Clayton-Powell Lord Sr. (mentioned character)  Born post-1916. Brother of Victor Lord.

Second generation
 Victoria Lord (Gillian Spencer, Joanne Dorian, Erika Slezak)  Original character. Born off-screen August 14, 1946, to Victor Lord and Eugenia Randolph Lord as of 1968.
 Meredith Lord (Trish Van Devere, Lynn Benesch)  Original character. Born off-screen December 1, 1950, to Victor Lord and Eugenia Randolph Lord as of 1968; dies onscreen August 8, 1973.
 Anthony "Tony" Lord (George Reinholt, Philip MacHale, Chip Lucia)  Born off-screen in 1945 to Victor Lord and Dorothy Randolph as of 1975; presumed dead September 18, 1983.
 Richard Abbott (Luke Reilly, Keith Langsdale, Robert Gribbon, Jeffrey Byron)  Born off-screen in the early 1950s to Gwendolyn Lord Abbott and Jonathan Abbott as of 1978.
 Tina Lord (Andrea Evans, Kelli Maroney, Marsha Clark, Karen Witter, Krista Tesreau)  Born off-screen March 14, 1962, to Victor Lord and Irene Manning Lord as of 1985.
 Thomas Todd Manning (Roger Howarth, Trevor St. John)  Born off-screen January 2, 1974, then revised to 1970 to Victor Lord and Irene Manning as of 1995; birthday changed to April 29, 1970 as of 2013. Identical twin of Victor Lord Jr.
 Clayton-Powell Lord II (mentioned character)  Born off-screen to Clayton-Powell Lord Sr. and Margaret Lord as of 1993.
 Victor Lord Jr. (Trevor St. John)  Born off-screen January 2, 1974, then revised to 1970 to Victor Lord and Irene Manning as of 2011; birthday changed to April 29, 1970, as of 2013. Identical twin of Todd Manning.

Third generation
 Daniel Wolek (Timothy Waldrip, Steven Culp, Ted Demers, Joshua Cox, Michael Palance, and child actors)  Born onscreen November 17, 1971, to Meredith Lord Wolek and Larry Wolek; birth year changed to 1966 as of 1983.
 Brian Kendall (Stephen Austin)  Born off-screen in 1967 Tony Lord and Pat Ashley, adopted by Paul Kendall as of 1975; dies onscreen April 27, 1978.
 Kevin Lord Riley Buchanan (Kevin Stapleton, Timothy Gibbs, Dan Gauthier, and others)  Born onscreen September 12, 1976, to Victoria Lord Riley and Joe Riley, adopted by Clint Buchanan; birth year changed to 1970 as of 1996.
 Joseph "Joey" Francis Riley Buchanan (Nathan Fillion, Don Jeffcoat, Bruce Michael Hall, Tom Degnan, and others)  Born onscreen January 8, 1980, to Victoria Lord Riley and Joe Riley, adopted by Clint Buchanan; birth year changed to 1975 as of 1993.
 Jessica Eugenia Buchanan (Erin Torpey, Bree Williamson, and child actors)  Born off-screen September 23, 1986, to Victoria Lord Buchanan and Clint Buchanan; birth year changed to 1978 as of 2005. Fraternal twin of Natalie Buchanan.
 Clinton James "C. J." Roberts (Tyler Noyes and others)  Born onscreen April 3, 1987, to Tina Lord Roberts and Cord Roberts; birthday changed to 1981 as 2007.
 Megan Gordon (Jessica Tuck)  Born off-screen December 25, 1963, to Victoria Lord Gordon and Roger Gordon; dies onscreen February 7, 1992.
 Clayton-Powell "Powell" Lord III (Sean Moynihan)  Born off-screen around 1970 to Clayton-Powell Lord II and Patricia Lord as of 1993; dies onscreen May 19, 2009.
 Sarah Victoria Roberts (Hayden Panettiere, Shanelle Workman, Justis Bolding, and others)  Born onscreen February 6, 1991, to Tina Lord Roberts and Cord Roberts; birthday changed to 1985 as of 2007.
 Starr Manning (Kristen Alderson and child actors)  Born onscreen January 8, 1996, to Todd Manning and Blair Cramer Manning; birth year changed to 1992 as of 1998 then change to 1990, 2013.
 Natalie Buchanan (Melissa Archer)  Born onscreen September 23, 1986, to Victoria Lord Buchanan and Clint Buchanan; birth year 1978 as of 2005. Fraternal twin of Jessica Buchanan.
 John "Jack" Cramer Manning (Carmen LoPorto, Andrew Trischitta, and child actors)  Born onscreen October 11, 2001, to Todd Manning and Blair Cramer Manning; birth year changed to 1997 as of 2011.
 Samuel "Sam" Manning (Patrick Gibbons Jr., others)  Born onscreen February 5, 2006, to Trevor St. John's Todd Manning (retconned to Victor Lord Jr. in 2011) and Margaret Cochran, adopted by Blair Cramer; birth year changed to 2004 as of 2010.
 Danielle Manning (Kelley Missal)  Born off-screen in 2002 to Todd Manning and Téa Delgado, revised to October 20, 1995, as of 2009, and revised again to 1991 as of 2013.

Fourth generation

 Demerest "Duke" Buchanan (Matthew Metzger and child actors)  Born onscreen June 29, 1992, to Kevin Buchanan and LeeAnn Demerest Buchanan; birth year changed to 1986 as of 2004, dies onscreen May 12, 2006.
 Bree Victoria Brennan (Stephanie Schmahl and others) Born onscreen May 1, 2006, to Jessica Buchanan Brennan and Nash Brennan.
 Hope Manning-Thornhart (child actors) Born onscreen November 6, 2008, to Starr Manning and Cole Thornhart; presumed dead in General Hospital crossover February 28, 2012.
 Ryder Asa Ford (child actors)  Born onscreen January 11, 2011, to Jessica Buchanan and Robert Ford as of 2011.
 Liam Asa McBain (child actors)  Born onscreen January 11, 2011, to Natalie Buchanan and John McBain as of 2011.

Fifth generation
 Zane Buchanan (child actors)  Born onscreen October 31, 2006, to Duke Buchanan and Kelly Cramer.

Introduction
At the show's debut in July 1968, patriarch Victor Dalby Lord is introduced as the wealthy publisher of the regional newspaper, The Banner, in the fictional Philadelphia Main Line town of Llanview, Pennsylvania, and owner of media conglomerate Lord Enterprises. Victor lives at his ancestral, 18th-century country estate named Llanfair with his daughters Victoria (nicknamed "Viki") and Meredith. Victor's wife and Victoria and Meredith's mother, Eugenia Randolph Lord, dies while giving birth to Meredith. With no son to succeed him, Victor concentrates on grooming elder Viki strictly, with her position as legal heiress to his fortune. As a result of this lifelong pressure, Viki, newly arrived from college, allows herself little time for romantic entanglements, focusing her energy on her inherited media career and her father's approval. Conversely, frail and emotional, yet free-spirited Meredith, all but overlooked by Victor, sought escape from his oppression and the future he had laid out for his daughters.

Lord Enterprises, Inc.

Lord Enterprises, Inc. are the legacy media assets of Victor Lord, including The Banner daily newspaper, WVL/WVLE-TV, WVLE radio, and life interest of the Llanfair estate. Victor's heiress daughter, Victoria, inherits publishing rights to the Banner newspaper as a part of Victor's initial will in 1976. Dorian Cramer Lord is initially bequeathed the landed Llanfair estate and part-ownership of WVL/WVLE-TV, WVLE radio, and The Banner; Viki purchases Dorian's stake in the newspaper soon after Victor's death. Victor's nephew Richard Abbott is appointed head of the European bureau of The Banner in 1979 by Viki's then-husband Joe Riley. The landed estate and majority ownership of the broadcast media outlets revert to Victoria in 1982 due to a codicil stipulating Llanfair and legacy assets return to the legal biological Lord heir (1976) if Victor's spouse remarries, which Dorian does at Llanfair with attorney Herb Callison that year. Dorian continues to live at Llanfair until she is forcibly removed by Viki's new husband, Clint Buchanan later that year. Tina Lord (formerly Tina Clayton) gains rightful access to the estate when Victor reveals her paternity to him in a letter during The Banner newspaper's 50th anniversary celebrations in 1985. Richard briefly takes over the company when Viki suffers a recurrent bout with her mental illness in 1986. Todd Manning is revealed to be Victor's illegitimate son and rightful male heir in 1995, gaining him partial ownership of WVLE radio, access to Llanfair, and an inherited trust of $30 million.

The Sun tabloid newspaper (formerly Dorian's The Intruder) is bought and edited by Todd Manning with millions of dollars in inheritance bequeathed to him at the revelation of his paternity to Victor in 1995; Todd's twin brother, Victor Lord Jr., assumes ownership of Todd's assets (under his brother's identity) from 2003 until Victor Jr.'s apparent death in 2011. Victor Jr.'s assets are betrothed to Irene Manning as part of Victor Jr.'s will, access which then reverts to legal heiress Tina at Irene's death in October 2011. Later in court proceedings, Tina relinquishes control of Todd's assets, returning them to Todd. Concurrently in October 2011, Jack Manning is named executive assistant and editor for The Sun by Victor Jr., a position he keeps when Todd returns to work for the company. Jessica Buchanan reports for both her grandfather and mother's newspaper, The Banner, and her uncle's tabloid, The Sun, at various times in the 1990s and 2000s.

Todd founds subsidiary Manning Enterprises in June 2012, purchasing Port Charles publications Crimson magazine and The Port Charles Sun (formerly The Port Charles Press) newspaper. Upon the Todd's exit from Port Charles, his Port Charles acquisitions revert to their former names and prior ownerships.

Companies
 The Banner – Chief daily newspaper for Llanview, Pennsylvania with a European bureau in Paris
 The Sun – Tabloid newspaper in Llanview and primary competitor of The Banner (formerly The Intruder)
 WVL/WVLE-TV – Local television station which produces news, talk, and television programming in Llanview
 WVLE – Radio station for Llanview University and surrounding community
 Manning Enterprises – Port Charles, New York publications Crimson magazine and The Port Charles Sun (formerly The Port Charles Press) tabloid, a cable television franchise, a sports publication, and two publishing houses (2012–13)
 Lord/Manning Plant – Power plant owned by Victoria Lord and Clint Buchanan (1984–85)

Employees and estate trustees
 Chairwoman/CEO: Victoria Lord – Publisher of The Banner newspaper, owner of WVL-TV and WVLE radio
 Co-owner: Dorian Lord
 Co-owner: Todd Manning – Co-owner of WVLE radio, publisher of The Sun
 Trustee: Richard Abbott – Managing editor of the European bureau of The Banner
 Trustee: Tina Lord
 Trustee: Victor Lord Jr.
 Trustee: Kevin Riley Buchanan – Editor of The Banner
 Trustee: Joey Riley Buchanan
 Trustee: Jessica Buchanan – Journalist for The Banner and The Sun
 Trustee: Natalie Buchanan
 Trustee: Starr Manning
 Trustee: Jack Manning – Editor and executive assistant for The Sun

Family tree

|-
|
|-
|

|-
|style="text-align: left;"|Notes:

Descendants

 Randolph Lord (deceased); married Virginia "Ginny" Fletcher
 Unnamed son (deceased); married Unnamed woman (deceased)
 Clayton-Powell Lord (deceased); married Margaret Lord (deceased)
 Clayton-Powell Lord II (deceased); married Trish Lord
 Clayton-Powell Lord III (1970–2009)
 Victor Lord (1916–2003); married Eugenia Randolph (194?–50), Irene Manning (1960s), Dorian Cramer (1975–76)
 Tony Lord (1945–83); Victor's son with Dorothy Randolph; married Cathy Craig (1976–77), Pat Ashley (1982–83)
 Brian Kendall (1967–78); Tony and Pat's son.
 Victoria Lord (1946–); Victor and Eugenia's daughter; married Roger Gordon (1963), Joe Riley (1969–71, 1974–79), Steve Burke (1972–73), Clint Buchanan (1982–85, 1986–1994), Sloan Carpenter (1994–95), Ben Davidson (2000–04), Charlie Banks (2009–11)
 Megan Gordon (1963–92); Viki and Roger's daughter; married Jake Harrison (1992–93)
 Kevin Buchanan (1965–); Viki and Joe's son; adopted by Clint; married LeeAnn Demerest (1992–93), Cassie Callison (1998–99), Kelly Cramer (2003–04)
 Duke Buchanan (1986–2006); Kevin and LeeAnn's son.
 Zane Buchanan (1995–); Duke's son with Kelly Cramer.
 Joey Buchanan (1976–); Viki and Joe's son; adopted by Clint; married Jennifer Rappaport (2003–04), Aubrey Wentworth (2011)
 Natalie Buchanan (1978–); Viki and Clint's twin daughter; married Mitch Laurence (2002–03), Cristian Vega (2003–05), Jared Banks (2009)
 Liam McBain (2011–); Natalie's son with John McBain.
 Jessica Buchanan (1978–) Viki and Clint's twin daughter; married Tico Santi (2004), Antonio Vega (2006–07), Nash Brennan (2007–08), Robert Ford (2011), Cutter Wentworth (2011)
 Megan Rappaport (1999); Jessica's stillborn daughter with Will Rappaport.
 Bree Brennan (2006–); Jessica and Nash's daughter.
 Chloe Brennan (2008); Jessica and Nash's stillborn daughter.
 Ryder Ford (2011–); Jessica and Robert's son.
 Meredith Lord (1950–73); Victor and Eugenia's daughter; married Larry Wolek (1970–73)
 Daniel Wolek (1966–); Meredith and Larry's son.
 Tina Lord (1962–); Victor and Irene's daughter; married Cord Roberts (1986–90, 1991–93, 2011–), Cain Rogan (1994), David Vickers (1995)
 C. J. Roberts (1981–); Cord and Tina's son.
 Sarah Roberts (1985–); Cord and Tina's daughter.
 Todd Manning (1970–); Victor and Irene's twin son; married Blair Cramer (1995, 1995–97, 2001–02, 2013–), Téa Delgado (1997–98, 1998–99)
 Starr Manning (1991–); Todd and Blair's daughter.
 Hope Manning-Thornhart (2008–12); Starr's daughter with Cole Thornhart.
 Jack Manning (1995–); Todd and Blair's son.
 Danielle Manning (1992–); Todd and Téa's daughter.
 Victor Lord, Jr. (1970–); Victor and Irene's twin son; married Blair Cramer (2003–04, 2007–08), Téa Delgado (2009, 2010–)
 Sam Manning (2004–); Victor's son with Margaret Cochran; adopted by Blair.
 Gwendolyn Lord (deceased); married Jonathan Abbott (widowed)
 Richard Abbott; Gwendolyn and Jonathan's son; married Becky Lee Hunt (1978–81)

References

Notes

External links
 Lord family tree – ABC.com
 Lord family tree – SoapCentral.com

One Life to Live families
One Life to Live characters
General Hospital characters
General Hospital families